David "Dai" Rees (birth unknown – death unknown) was a Welsh rugby union and professional rugby league footballer who played in the 1900s and 1910s. He played club level rugby union (RU) for Penygraig RFC, and representative level rugby league (RL) for Wales, and at club level for Salford, as a forward (prior to the specialist positions of), during the era of contested scrums.

Background
Dai Rees was born in Dinas Cross, Fishguard, Wales.

Playing career

International honours
Dai Rees won two caps for Wales while at Salford in 1908.

Challenge Cup Final appearances
Dai Rees played as a forward, i.e. number 10, in Salford's 0–5 defeat by Bradford F.C. in the 1906 Challenge Cup Final during the 1905–06 season at Headingley Rugby Stadium, Leeds on Saturday 28 April 1906.

References

Penygraig RFC players
Place of death missing
Rugby league forwards
Rugby league players from Pembrokeshire
Rugby union players from Fishguard
Salford Red Devils players
Wales national rugby league team players
Welsh rugby league players
Welsh rugby union players
Year of birth missing
Year of death missing